The 1957 Campeonato Profesional was the tenth season of Colombia's top-flight football league. The tournament consisted of a first stage, a cancelled octagonal stage, and a two-group second stage, and ended on 13 April 1958. 12 teams participated in the tournament. Independiente Medellín won the league for 2nd time in its history after defeating Cúcuta Deportivo in the championship playoff with an aggregate score of 8–3. Atlético Quindío, the defending champion, was 3rd in the first stage with 24 points, and was then eliminated in the second stage.

Background
12 teams competed in the tournament. Libertad de Barranquilla was the only team from the previous season who did not participate.

League system
Teams received two points for a win and one point for a draw. On the first stage, every team played two games against each other team, one at home and one away, and the first 8 teams qualified for the octagonal stage. From this stage, the team with most points would be the champion of the season, however the stage was cancelled after 8 matches due to claims from the teams eliminated in the first stage. Then, a second stage was played, with two groups of six teams each. The champion of each group played a playoff, and the champion of it played a champion playoff against the champion of the first stage.

Teams

First stage

Results

Octagonal (canceled)

Results

Second stage

Group A

Results

First-place playoff

Results

Group B

Results

Final

Cúcuta Deportivo qualified to Champion Playoff on coin toss. Because of this, a Runners-up Playoff was also played after the Champion Playoff.

Champion playoff

Runners-up playoff

Top goalscorers

Source: RSSSF.com Colombia 1957

References

External links
Dimayor official page

Prim
Colombia
Categoría Primera A seasons